Deepsea, deep-sea, deep sea, or variant, may refer to:

 the deep sea, the lowest layer of the ocean
 Deepsea ASA, a subsidiary of Odfjell Drilling
 Deep Sea 3D, an IMAX film

See also
 Deep-Sea Trench
 Deep-sea exploration
 Deepsea mining
 Deep-sea submersible
 Deepsea Challenger